War at Sea is a strategic board wargame depicting the naval war in the Atlantic during World War II, published by Jedko Games in 1975, and subsequently republished by Avalon Hill in 1976 and more recently by L2 Design Group in 2007.

It is also the basis for the design of the subsequent Avalon Hill game, Victory in the Pacific.

Game summary

Units represented in the game are individual ships of heavy cruiser size or larger, with provisions also given for convoys, submarines (specifically 'U-boats'), and air power. Each turn represents a period of roughly six months. The board represents the Atlantic Ocean and the Mediterranean Sea, which are divided up into six zones.  Control of as many of these zones as possible, for as many turns as possible, is the goal of the game.  One player assumes the role of the Allied player, and controls the British, Soviet, and American navies.  His or her opponent is the Axis player, and controls the German and Italian navies.  In addition to the units representing individual ships, both players have one unit each that represents land-based airplane squadrons, and the Axis player has units that represent squadrons of U-boats.

Ships are represented by a single counter which typically gives three factors: gunnery, armor, and speed. While these are the essential statistics for surface vessels, this system keeps them all highly abstracted, as each is just a simple number, falling within a range of 0 to 9. Aircraft carriers have a fourth factor, in this case representing the naval air-power on board.  The land-based air units each represent three air attacks (against three different targets).

Each turn begins with both players' ships in ports.  The Allied player's ports include England, the United States, Leningrad, "Russia" (actually Murmansk, on the Arctic Ocean), and Malta, in the Mediterranean.  The Axis player's ports include Germany, France (after Turn Two, when it is assumed that Germany conquers France by land, just as it did in the real war), and Italy.  Each turn, each player (the Allied player first, and then the Axis player) moves all, some, or none of his ships into sea areas that are adjacent to the port in which those ships started the turn.  Ships can also attempt to move one additional sea area if the first area was not controlled by the enemy on the previous turn; to accomplish that, the ship must roll a die and get a result less than that ship's speed factor.  Ships that have a speed factor of seven or eight are thus automatically able to move two spaces, and are therefore very valuable.  The proviso that the first area may not have been controlled by the enemy allows either player (usually the Allied player) to make certain that areas of the sea are unreachable to the enemy fleet due to intervening controlled areas.  Ships that remain in port instead of moving are able to repair damage that they may have sustained in previous turns (see the paragraph on combat, below).  When the Allied player is finished, the Axis player moves his ships.  U-boats are able to move to any sea area and are therefore the only ships that cannot be blockaded by enemy control.

If only one player's ships occupy a sea area after movement is finished, that player controls the sea area for the turn, and he or she scores points for it (the number of points varies, depending on which sea area is controlled by which player).  If there are ships from both sides in the same sea area, the two fleets must fight at least one round of combat.

Combat is resolved with each ship picking a target and rolling one die per gunnery factor, and each 'hit' (generally, a roll of six) is re-rolled to produce the amount of damage generated, which is applied to the target's armor factor.  If the amount of damage exceeds the armor factor, the ship is sunk. Air attacks are resolved by rolling one die for each attack at a number of targets equal to the air factor.  On a roll of five, the ship is disabled, which means that it is forced to return to port.

This method generates a lot of dice rolls, and gave the game the nicknames 'Dice at Sea' and 'Yahtzee at Sea', with critics arguing that it depended too much upon luck, and supporters countering that the high number of die rolls actually allows the luck to even out.

Minor rules include provisions for U-boat combat, the 'neutral port' of South America (which is where disabled ships in the South Atlantic sea area must go, and which they have to leave the following turn, lest the owning player lose points), convoys (which score additional points for the Allied player if they make it to England or Russia), and the possible internment of the Italian fleet if the Allies control the Mediterranean Sea for much of the game.

Variations

Numerous variations (or 'variants,' to use the word preferred by Avalon Hill) were published for War at Sea in the years since it was released.  Many of them appeared in the General, Avalon Hill's house magazine.  Among these variations are rules for the French Navy (which is interned early in the war), the Greek Navy, a third Russian port on the Black Sea, Allied mini-submarines (such as the 'X-craft' submarines that were used to attack the German battleship Tirpitz late in the war), and additional ships that were not represented in the original game.  These variations add simulation detail to the game (meaning that they made it more like the real war at sea), but at the expense of making it slightly harder to play.

Tournaments
During the early 1980s War at Sea was played in Israel as part of a historic educational effort by Bnei Akiva beginning in Rehovot and then in Jerusalem with later to become famous participants such as Israeli media tycoon Shlomo Ben-Zvi and Rosh yeshiva Nehalim Shlomo Lorincz.

War at Sea is still played in many competitive tournaments today, including the World Boardgaming Championships, PrezCon, and by PBEM on the BPA Tournament, and PBEM Ladder all for decades running, and still maintains AREA Ratings for players as well.

Reception
In his 1977 book The Comprehensive Guide to Board Wargaming, Nick Palmer noted that the playing time of this game was only an hour, and called it "a pleasant little contest without being a full-fledged wargame in the more sophisticated sense." In his 1980 sequel,  The Best of Board Wargaming , Palmer added "excellent introductory fare to entice newcomers into the hobby."

In the 1980 book The Complete Book of Wargames, game designer Jon Freeman called this "the simplest real wargame on the market and ideal for introducing newcomers to the hobby." Freeman concluded by giving the game an Overall Evaluation of "Good", saying, "Although it's no great shakes as a simulation, and the bane of adherents of the SPI school of realism-by-complexity, it's a pleasant little game."

In The Guide to Simulations/Games for Education and Training, Martin Campion commented on its use as an educational aid, saying, "In spite of its historical distortions and lack of realism, War at Sea is some help in seeing the situation in the Atlantic and shows why the British feared the small German Fleet." Unlike other critics, Campion did not think this was a good introduction to wargaming, pointing out that "its system is not even distantly related to the systems used in more complex games."

Other reviews and commentary
 Casus Belli #16 (Aug 1983)
Campaign #76 & #103
Fire & Movement #62
Panzerfaust #70
Games & Puzzles #61

References

External links

Australian board games
Avalon Hill games
Board games introduced in 1975
Naval board wargames
Naval games
Wargames introduced in 1975
World War II board wargames